KRAI-FM (93.7 FM) is a radio station licensed to Craig, Colorado, United States. The station is currently owned by Don Tlapek, through licensee Blizzard Broadcasting, LLC.

History
The station was assigned the call letters KRAI-FM on 1981-06-24. On 1981-11-26, the station changed its call sign to KXRC, and on 1984-05-01 to the current KRAI-FM.

FM Translator
KRAI-FM programming is also carried on an FM translator, which broadcasts on a frequency of 102.3 MHz. The effective radiated power is horizontal polarization only, according to the FCC database.

References

External links
 
 Radio Locator Information on K272DE

RAI-FM
Radio stations established in 1981